Stannin is a protein that in humans is encoded by the SNN gene.

References

Further reading